Paxton is a town in Worcester County, Massachusetts, United States. The population was 5,004 at the 2020 census.

History

Paxton was first settled by Europeans in 1749 and was officially incorporated in 1765. It was previously occupied by the Nipmuc tribe. 

The district of Paxton was originally taken from the towns of Leicester and Rutland, in nearly equal parts, and was incorporated February 12, 1765. Charles Paxton, marshal of the Admiralty Court, offered a church bell to the town if it was named after him; no such gift was ever made. The inhabitants soon commenced their plan for building a meeting house, and on the first day of April 1765, the town voted to build it. It was raised on 18 June 1766, and this is the frame of the present meeting house.

In 1766, within two years of the incorporation of the town, the foundation of the present meeting house was laid, on what is now the common, near the flagstaff. The land was given by Seth Howe, from a piece of his pasture.

David Davis went to Boston with a pair of oxen and drew to Paxton the bell now in use, which was made by Paul Revere.

A small historic and now defunct amusement park called "Paxton Navy Yard" operated here in the mid 20th century.

Asnebumskit Hill was the site of the Yankee Network's early FM broadcasting antenna, beginning its commercial operations in Summer 1939.

Geography

Adjacent cities and towns

Demographics

As of the census of 2000, there were 4,386 people, 1,428 households, and 1,153 families residing in the town. The racial makeup of the town was 96.69% White, 0.68% African American, 0.09% Native American, 1.07% Asian, 0.57% from other races, and 0.89% from two or more races. Hispanic or Latino of any race were 1.55% of the population.

There were 1,428 households, out of which 36.1% had children under the age of 18 living with them, 72.1% were married couples living together, 6.0% had a female householder with no husband present, and 19.2% were non-families. 15.7% of all households were made up of individuals, and 8.3% had someone living alone who was 65 years of age or older. The average household size was 2.79 and the average family size was 3.13.

In the town, the population was spread out, with 23.9% under the age of 18, 13.6% from 18 to 24, 23.9% from 25 to 44, 24.0% from 45 to 64, and 14.6% who were 65 years of age or older. The median age was 38 years. For every 100 females, there were 91.5 males. For every 100 females age 18 and over, there were 87.0 males.

The median income for a household in the town was $72,039, and the median income for a family was $80,498. Males had a median income of $51,694 versus $38,409 for females. The per capita income for the town was $29,573. None of the families and 1.8% of the population were living below the poverty line, including no under eighteens and 4.5% of those over 64.

Arts and culture

Points of interest
 Moore State Park
 Worcester County Memorial Park
 Thompson Pond (Massachusetts)

Education

Anna Maria College's main campus is in Paxton, and the college recently opened a new campus in Worcester.
Paxton is a member of the Wachusett Regional School District.
Paxton Center School is the town's kindergarten, elementary and middle school (K–8).
The public high school is Wachusett Regional High School, in Holden, Massachusetts.
As of 2005, high school students may choose to attend Bay Path Regional Vocational Technical High School.
Paxton Center School offers band, chorus and track to students in grades 5–8. All students participate in physical education, art education and technology classes.

Library

The Paxton public library began in 1877. In fiscal year 2008, the town of Paxton spent 1.53% ($143,354) of its budget on its public library—approximately $30 per person ($36.74 adjusted for inflation to 2021).

Infrastructure

Utilities
Electric service is provided by the town's own municipal light department.
Water service is provided by the town's own water department. Paxton's principal source of drinking water is Asnebumskit Pond. Recently, Paxton sells the raw Asnebumskit Pond water to Worcester, and buys back water treated at Worcester's filtration plant.
Telephone service is provided by Verizon. All phones in Paxton are connected to Verizon's main central office in Worcester.
Cable television service is provided by Charter Communications.
No natural gas or sewer service is available in Paxton. At least one house on the Paxton-Worcester city line is connected to the Worcester sewer system. Paxton residents voted down the creation of the South Paxton Sewer District at a February 28, 2006 town meeting. This district would have installed sewers in the part of Paxton adjacent to Worcester.

Notable people

Ralph Earl, portrait painter
James Earl, portrait painter
David Goodman, Medal of Honor recipient
Todd Richards, U.S. Olympic Snowboarder

References

External links

 Town of Paxton, Massachusetts
 Wachusett Regional School District
 Bay Path Regional Vocational Technical High School 

Populated places established in 1749
Towns in Massachusetts
Towns in Worcester County, Massachusetts